F.C. Ettifaq, Dammam ( Saudi Arabia ) season 2021-2022
Darko Tešović (born 3 August 1970) is a Serbian football manager and former player.

Playing career
In his native country, Tešović played for Radnički Beograd, Partizan, Teleoptik, and Budućnost Banatski Dvor. He spent six seasons with the Crno-beli in the 1990s, winning four national championships and two national cups. Between 1999 and 2002, Tešović represented Greek club Ethnikos Asteras, recording 73 appearances and scoring 16 goals in the top flight.

Managerial career
After serving as an assistant to Vladan Milojević at Panionios in Greece, Tešović was appointed manager of Serbian League Vojvodina club Radnički Nova Pazova in June 2017. He subsequently took charge at Serbian First League club Radnički Kragujevac in June 2018. After that he was the headcoach in FK Mačva Šabac  Then he continued to work in  FK Novi Pazar . The following period he spent abroad as an assistant coach of  Vladan Milojević  in  Al-Ahli Saudi FC  in Jeddah, Saudi Arabia;  AEK Athens F.C.  from Athens and  Ettifaq FC  situated in Dammam in Saudi Arabia.

Honours
Partizan
 First League of FR Yugoslavia: 1993–94, 1995–96, 1996–97, 1998–99
 FR Yugoslavia Cup: 1993–94, 1997–98

References

External links
 
 

AEK Athens F.C. non-playing staff
Al Ahli Saudi FC non-playing staff
Association football midfielders
Ethnikos Asteras F.C. players
Expatriate football managers in Greece
Expatriate football managers in Saudi Arabia
Expatriate footballers in Greece
First League of Serbia and Montenegro players
FK Budućnost Banatski Dvor players
FK Mačva Šabac managers
FK Novi Pazar managers
FK Partizan non-playing staff
FK Partizan players
FK Radnički 1923 managers
FK Radnički Beograd players
FK Teleoptik players
Footballers from Belgrade
Serbia and Montenegro expatriate footballers
Serbia and Montenegro expatriate sportspeople in Greece
Serbia and Montenegro footballers
Serbian expatriate football managers
Serbian football managers
Serbian footballers
Serbian SuperLiga managers
Super League Greece players
Yugoslav footballers
Yugoslav Second League players
1970 births
Living people